Vallonia declivis is a species of very small air-breathing land snail, a terrestrial pulmonate gastropod mollusk in the family Valloniidae.

Distribution 
This species is found in Austria, France, Germany, Poland, and Switzerland.  It was previously listed as part of the fauna of Slovakia, but Čejka considered its occurrence in Slovakia unlikely. It lives also in the Czech Republic (in Bohemia only) and in Slovakia.

References

External links 
 "Species summary for Vallonia declivis". AnimalBase

Valloniidae
Gastropods described in 1892
Taxonomy articles created by Polbot